The Subcommittee on Emerging Threats and Spending Oversight is one of the three subcommittees within the Senate Committee on Homeland Security and Governmental Affairs. It was known in previous Congresses as the Subcommittee on Federal Spending Oversight and Emergency Management.

Jurisdiction
 Preventing waste, fraud, and abuse related to federal spending;
 Identifying and examining emerging national and economic security threats;
 Examining federal preparedness to respond and address emerging threats including terrorism, disruptive technologies, misinformation and disinformation, climate change, and chemical, biological, radiological, nuclear, and explosive attacks;
 Improving coordination and addressing conflicts between federal departments and agencies, state, local, territorial, tribal governments, and private sector entities for emerging threat preparedness and prevention;
 Conducting oversight of the protection of civil rights and civil liberties by the Department of Homeland Security; and
 Modernizing federal information technology.

Members, 118th Congress

References

External links
 Official Subcommittee Website

Homeland Security Spending